Portaferry GAC is a GAA Club in the East of Down in the Ards Peninsula. It is one of three Senior Hurling Clubs in Down, the other two being Ballygalget GAA and Ballycran GAA.

History
The depth of the hurling tradition in the Ards can be gauged from the fact that the game was first played on the Peninsula as early as 1900 by Portaferry Carraig Uladh.

But it was Ned Purcell, an agricultural inspector from Tipperary, who laid the real foundations between 1912 and 1917. His influence not only left Portaferry with the Tipp colours, but also Tipperary skills and love of the game.

Locals such as John Emerson, John McCullough, John and Eddie Dumigan and Fr Toal carried on where Ned left off and such was the interest that 4 teams from Portaferry competed in the Ards Gaelic Association during the early Twenties. Thiswas rewarded with Carraig Uladh's first S.H.C. title in 1926 and their winning of the Antrim League title in 1929.

The tradition was sustained, in both Antrim and Down leagues in theThirties, but the war years, with travel curtailed, saw the Ards thrown once more back on its own resources, and the formation of clubs in Ballycran and Ballygalget with wholehearted assistance from Portaferry.

The club's modern period date from 1948 when it was reformed as St. Patrick's under the guidance of the Very Rev. George Watson and by 1950 had moved into its new pitch at St. Patrick's Park.

Progress was slow but steady through the Fifties. In 1960 Portaferry gained entry into the Antrim League Division II, won promotion and won its first Down S.H.C. title as St. Patrick's. Many more County titles have been added since and the club have produced many players of inter-county and inter-provincial calibre.

In 2002 Portaferry won their third Down County Hurling Senior Championship in a row as well as lifting the Antrim Division one league title.

Honours
Ulster Senior Club Hurling Championship (1): 2014
Down Senior Hurling Championship (20): 1926, 1929, 1938, 1963, 1965, 1968, 1969, 1971, 1978, 1981, 1988, 1989, 1991, 1996, 2000, 2001, 2002, 2006, 2012, 2020, 2022 2022 2014, 2020

Recent Times

Portaferry Hurling club have still competed at the highest level of Ulster Hurling in both Senior, Intermediate and Junior. They are still in the Division 1 Antrim League and last won the county Championship in 2014 and won their first ever Ulster Senior Club Championship on 2 November 2014.

Ciara Mageean's cousin Conor plays hurling for Portaferry and she watched him win the 2020 Down Senior Hurling Championship.

Notable players

 Gerard McGrattan - Down's only Hurling Allstar
 Noel Sands
 Paul McMullan
 Paud Braniff
 Paul Braniff

Current Hurling Squad (2014 Year Ulster Championship Final)

External links
Portaferry GAC website

References

Gaelic games clubs in County Down
Hurling clubs in County Down
1912 establishments in Ireland